is a Japanese politician and member of the House of Councillors for the Social Democratic Party (SDP). Elected in 2004 as an independent candidate with support of the Democratic Party of Japan and the SDP from Niigata Prefecture (No. 1 with 428,117 votes), he is, as of 2008, the only directly elected SDP member of the House of Councillors.

Kondo is a graduate of Chuo University and worked as a lawyer in Niigata. From 1987 to 2004 he was a member of the Niigata prefectural assembly.

References 

1947 births
Living people
Chuo University alumni
20th-century Japanese lawyers
Members of the House of Councillors (Japan)
Social Democratic Party (Japan) politicians